The 2022 New Holland Canadian Junior Curling Championships was held from March 26 to April 1 at the Stratford Rotary Complex in Stratford, Ontario. The winning teams represent Canada at the 2023 World Junior Curling Championships in Füssen, Germany.

This was the second time Stratford hosted the Canadian Junior Curling Championships. The first was in 2016 when Manitoba's Matt Dunstone and Nova Scotia's Mary Fay took home the titles. The 2022 event featured eighteen teams on both the men's and women's sides, each split into two pools of nine. The top three teams from each pool at the end of the round robin advanced to the playoff round. Based on results from the 2019 and 2020 events, certain provinces earned two berths to the championship. Alberta, British Columbia, Manitoba, Newfoundland and Labrador, Ontario and Saskatchewan each earned an extra berth on the men's side, while Alberta, Manitoba, Nova Scotia, Ontario and Quebec got two berths on the women's side.

Medallists

Men

Teams
The teams are listed as follows:

Round robin standings
Final Round Robin Standings

Round robin results

All draw times are listed in Eastern Time (UTC−04:00).

Draw 1
Saturday, March 26, 8:00 am

Draw 3
Saturday, March 26, 4:00 pm

Draw 5
Sunday, March 27, 8:00 am

Draw 7
Sunday, March 27, 4:00 pm

Draw 9
Monday, March 28, 9:00 am

Draw 11
Monday, March 28, 7:00 pm

Draw 13
Tuesday, March 29, 2:00 pm

Draw 15
Wednesday, March 30, 9:00 am

Draw 17
Wednesday, March 30, 7:00 pm

Playoffs

Quarterfinals
Thursday, March 31, 7:00 pm

Semifinals
Friday, April 1, 9:00 am

Bronze medal game
Friday, April 1, 2:30 pm

Final
Friday, April 1, 2:30 pm

Women

Teams
The teams are listed as follows:

Round robin standings
Final Round Robin Standings

Round robin results

All draw times are listed in Eastern Time (UTC−04:00).

Draw 2
Saturday, March 26, 12:00 pm

Draw 4
Saturday, March 26, 8:00 pm

Draw 6
Sunday, March 27, 12:00 pm

Draw 8
Sunday, March 27, 8:00 pm

Draw 10
Monday, March 28, 2:00 pm

Draw 12
Tuesday, March 29, 9:00 am

Draw 14
Tuesday, March 29, 7:00 pm

Draw 16
Wednesday, March 30, 2:00 pm

Draw 18
Thursday, March 31, 9:00 am

Playoffs

Quarterfinals
Thursday, March 31, 7:00 pm

Semifinals
Friday, April 1, 9:00 am

Bronze medal game
Friday, April 1, 2:30 pm

Final
Friday, April 1, 2:30 pm

Qualification

The Alberta U20 Junior Provincials were held from February 23–27, 2022 at the Spray Lake Sawmills Family Sports Centre in Cochrane.

The championship was held in a modified triple-knockout format, which qualified six teams for a championship round. Two men's teams and two women's teams qualified for the national championship.

Pre-Playoff Results:

Playoff Results:
Men's Quarterfinal 1: Cornelson 2 – Tao 8
Men's Quarterfinal 2: Wipf 8 – Ballance 9
Men's Semifinal 1: Sonnenberg 2 – Tao 5
Men's Semifinal 2: Helston 4 – Ballance 8
Men's Final: Tao 5 – Ballance 4

Women's Quarterfinal 1: Wood 6 – Wytrychowski 4
Women's Quarterfinal 2: Booth 5 – Shannon 4
Women's Semifinal 1: Jones 9 – Wood 6
Women's Semifinal 2: Gray-Withers 8 – Booth 6
Women's Final: Jones 5 – Gray-Withers 6

The BC U-21 Junior Curling Championships were held from February 22–27, 2022 at the Comox Valley Curling Club in Comox, British Columbia.

The championship was held in a round robin format, which qualified three men's teams and six women's teams for the championship round. Two men's teams qualified for the national championship.

Pre-Playoff Results:

Playoff Results:
Men's Semifinal: Kent 7 – Fenton 8
Men's Final: Deane 7 – Fenton 5

Women's Qualification Game 1: Buchy 10 – Brissette 7
Women's Qualification Game 2: Wong 0 – Richards 10
Women's Quarterfinal: Buchy 7 – Richards 8
Women's Semifinal 1: Bowles 5 – Hafeli 6
Women's Semifinal 2: Bowles 5 – Richards 11
Women's Final: Hafeli 9 – Richards 3

The Telus Junior Provincial Championships were held from February 22–27, 2022 at the Brandon Curling Club in Brandon.

The championship was held in a round robin format, which qualified four teams for a page-playoff championship round. Two men's teams and two women's teams qualified for the national championship.

Pre-Playoff Results:

Playoff Results:
Men's A1 vs B1: McDonald 6 – Johnson 1
Men's A2 vs B2: McGillivray 1 – Van Ryssel 9
Men's Semifinal: Johnson 7 – Van Ryssel 8
Men's Final: McDonald 6 – Van Ryssel 3

Women's Tiebreaker 1: Terrick 10 – Ogg 8
Women's Tiebreaker 2: Jensen 3 – Tober 7
Women's A1 vs B1: Maguet 7 – Beaudry 4
Women's A2 vs B2: Terrick 2 – Tober 6
Women's Semifinal: Beaudry 4 – Tober 6
Women's Final: Maguet 4 – Tober 11

The New Brunswick U20 Championship was held from February 25–28, 2022 at the Capital Winter Club in Fredericton.

The championship was held in a modified triple-knockout format, which qualified three teams for a championship round.

Pre-Playoff Results:

Playoff Results:
Men's Semifinal: R. Dalrymple 6 – Porter 5
Men's Final: Porter 2 – R. Dalrymple 6

Women's Semifinal: Evans 7 – Campbell 9
Women's Final: Evans 9 – Campbell 2

The U21 Juniors were held from February 22–27, 2022 at the Bally Haly Golf & Curling Club in St. John's.

The men's championship was held in a round robin format, while the women's event was held in a double round robin format. Two men's teams qualified for the national championship.

Pre-Playoff Results:

Playoff Results:
Men's Final: Young 10 – O'Leary 3

 No women's playoff round required as Team Mitchell had already beaten everybody twice.

The Best Western U21 Junior Provincials were held from March 3–6, 2022 at the Community First Curling Centre in Sault Ste. Marie.

The championship was held in round robin format, with the top two teams competing in the championship final.

Pre-Playoff Results:

Playoff Results:
 Men's Tiebreaker: Rajala 9 – O'Bright 8
 Men's Final: Burgess 6 – Rajala

 Women's Final: Croisier 6 – Lukowich 7

The NWTCA Junior Curling Championships were held from February 11–13, 2022 at the Yellowknife Curling Centre in Yellowknife.

No men's event was held as there was only one registered team, Team Mason MacNeil. The women's event was held in a best-of-five series between two rinks.

Results:

Due to the COVID-19 pandemic in Nova Scotia, the AMJ Campbell U21 Championships were cancelled. A selection process was held to determine the men's and women's representatives for the championship. Two women's teams qualified for the national championship.

Men's Team: Nick Mosher
Women's Team 1: Taylour Stevens
Women's Team 2: Sophie Blades

The Ontario U-21 Curling Championships were held from March 2–6, 2022 at the KW Granite Club in Waterloo.

The championship was held in a modified triple-knockout format, which qualified four teams for a championship round. Two men's teams and two women's teams qualified for the national championship.

Pre-Playoff Results:

Playoff Results:
Men's Final 1: Niepage 5 – Rooney 6
Men's Semifinal: Inglis 7 – Prenevost 6
Men's Final 2: Niepage 10 – Inglis 5

Women's Final 1: Deschenes 5 – Vivier 3
Women's Semifinal: Johnston 2 – Steele 4
Women's Final 2: Vivier 5 – Steele 6

The Pepsi PEI Provincial Junior Curling Championships were held from February 24–27, 2022 at the Cornwall Curling Club in Cornwall.

The championship was held in a modified triple-knockout format, which qualified three teams for a championship round.

Pre-Playoff Results:

Playoff Results:
 No men's playoff was required as Team Schut won all three qualifying events.

Women's Semifinal: Easter 4 – MacLean 11
Women's Final: Lenentine 7 – MacLean 11

The Quebec Performance Brush U21 Provincials were held from March 3–6, 2022 at the Club de curling Kénogami in Jonquière.

The championship was held in a round robin format, which qualified two men's teams and three women's teams for the championship round. Two women's teams qualified for the national championship.

Pre-Playoff Results:

Playoff Results:
Men's Final: Audibert 10 – Maurice 4

Women's Final 1: Cheal 9 – Daigle 1
Women's Semifinal: Fortin 8 – Gionest 4
Women's Final 2: Daigle 4 – Fortin 7

The Junior Provincials were held from February 24–28, 2022 at the Martensville Curling Club in Martensville.

The championship was held in a modified triple-knockout format, which qualified four teams for a championship round. Two men's teams qualified for the national championship.

Pre-Playoff Results:

Playoff Results:
Men's 1 vs. 2: Pomedli 4 – Bernath 7
Men's 3 vs. 4: Bryden 4 – Ede 9
Men's Semifinal: Pomedli 8 – Ede 2
Men's Final: Bernath 11 – Pomedli 4

Women's 1 vs. 2: Kleiter 9 – Kessel 2
Women's 3 vs. 4: Taylor 9 – Kesslering 4
Women's Semifinal: Kessel 7 – Taylor 6
Women's Final: Kleiter 6 – Kessel 4

Men's Team: No men's team declared
Women's Team: Bayly Scoffin (Whitehorse)

Notes

References

External links
Official Website

Junior Championships
Curling in Ontario
Canadian Junior Curling Championships
2022 in Ontario
Sport in Stratford, Ontario
March 2022 sports events in Canada
April 2022 sports events in Canada